The 1989 Vanderbilt Commodores football team represented Vanderbilt University in the 1989 NCAA Division I-A football season as a member of the Southeastern Conference (SEC). The Commodores were led by head coach Watson Brown in his fourth season and finished with a record of one win and ten losses (1–10 overall, 0–7 in the SEC).

Schedule

Source: 1989 Vanderbilt football schedule

References

Vanderbilt
Vanderbilt Commodores football seasons
Vanderbilt Commodores football